Garry David Middleton (born 19 July 1948 Corowa, New South Wales - 23 November 1994) was an Australian motorcycle speedway rider.

Career
He first came to Britain in 1967 a rode for a short time with the Belle Vue Aces and the King's Lynn Stars before getting a permanent ride with the Wimbledon Dons. He stayed with the Dons for the 1968 season but in 1969 he moved to the Hackney Hawks. He rode for the Hawks from 1969 until 1971. In 1972 he moved to the Oxford Rebels following a contract dispute with promoter Len Silver. Middleton also raced as an International rider for Australia.

Middleton incidents
He was nicknamed 'Cass the Gas' as he was a real showman and made his feelings known about a variety of subjects.

In 1969 he was involved in an incident with Roy Trigg at Cradley Heath. Garry tried to forcefully dive under Roy but Roy saw him and slowed down, leaving Middleton to shoot straight past him into the safety fence. Middleton then went into the pits into his toolbox and pulled out a handgun. He had to be dragged from the pits to avoid further trouble.

In 1971, in a meeting against then World Champion Ole Olsen, Olsen was riding so well that he was unbeaten, passing people almost for fun. In the second half of the meeting, Middleton, to entertain the crowd, jokingly strapped two broom handles to his handlebar to stop Olsen passing him. The match referee did not share his sense of humour and fined him.

World Final appearances

World Team Cup
 1976 -  London, White City Stadium (with John Boulger / Phil Crump / Billy Sanders / Phil Herne) - Winner - 31pts (0)

References

1948 births
1994 deaths
Australian speedway riders
People from New South Wales
Hackney Hawks riders
Wimbledon Dons riders
Coventry Bees riders
Belle Vue Aces riders
Newcastle Diamonds riders
King's Lynn Stars riders
Oxford Cheetahs riders
Birmingham Brummies riders
Leicester Lions riders